Residence in English law may refer to:

Family law, an area of the law that deals with family-related matters and domestic relations
Immigration law, refers to national government policies which control the phenomenon of immigration to their country
Taxation law

See also 

Residence in English family law, a term used to refer to not always similar concepts in various parts of English law including taxation, immigration, and family law